Tallaght Stadium is an association football stadium in the Republic of Ireland based in Tallaght, South Dublin. The club Shamrock Rovers originally announced details of the stadium in July, 1996. The stadium is now owned and operated by South Dublin County Council with Shamrock Rovers as the anchor tenants.

Stadium information
The main stand holds home supporters, club officials and press. A second stand on the opposite (east) side of the ground, was completed in August, 2009. This stand holds the stadium's TV gantry and brought the seating capacity to 6,000 and currently houses away fans. A temporary south stand was constructed over a short period in early September 2011 for Rovers' games in the 2011–12 UEFA Europa League group stage. In 2019 a permanent South Stand was opened behind one of the goals, bringing the capacity to 8,000. All three stands are covered. Construction of new North Stand started in 2022, which will complete the four side of the ground and bring the capacity up to 10,000 seats.

Refreshment stalls are located at the southern end as is a stadium control room. In June, 2013, a scoreboard was added to the stadium control room.

Temporary seating has been constructed at the stadium three times—once for a club friendly against Real Madrid, which gave the ground a temporary capacity of 10,900 again before the 2009 FAI Cup Final, giving the ground a temporary capacity of 8,500 and for Rovers' games in the 2011–12 UEFA Europa League group stage.

Megastore and Rovers Café
Located behind the main stand is the Shamrock Rovers Megastore. Though previously run by kit supplier, Umbro, it is now fully operated by Rovers. The Megastore was expanded in March, 2011, to include the Rovers Café. Within the Café is a large collection of memorabilia and trophies from the club's foundation in 1899 to the present day that have been donated to the Shamrock Rovers Heritage Trust and have been placed on public display. For the 2013 League of Ireland season, the cafe was replaced with a Customer service area.

Glenmalure Suite
Club members can visit the Glenmalure Suite 60 minutes before kick off, at half time, and after the game for 30 minutes. Occasional post match Q&A with the manager and players are held in the suite.

For the 2018 League of Ireland Premier Division season the bigger 1899 Suite opened for members.

History

Planning disagreements
The following chronology is taken from the Judgement from the High Court on the Judicial Review.

On 20 October 2000, Mulden International Limited transferred their lease to Slonepark Company Limited to build the stadium and work commenced in October, 2000. Work ceased at the site in November, 2001, with the pitch and drainage laid, the main stand almost complete and other buildings in various states of completion.

Following a prolonged period where no work was carried out at the stadium and a refusal by the Planning Authority in December 2004 to extend the lease the Council terminated the lease on 4 January 2004.

An examiner was appointed to Shamrock Rovers F.C. on 11 April 2005, and the council engaged in discussions with the examiner regarding the completion of the stadium and its use by Shamrock Rovers Football Club when completed. Following the examinership process a supporters group, the '400 Club' took control of Shamrock Rovers and run the club today as the Shamrock Rovers Members Club.

A public consultation process began on 18 July 2005, to complete the soccer stadium at Sean Walsh Memorial Park. Thomas Davis CLG participated fully in the public consultation process. A county Managers report was presented to the council on 12 December 2005, which provided for the increase of playing area to accommodate senior Gaelic games and other uses subject to allocation of funds from the Department of Arts, Sports and Tourism. The council then informed the Department of the resolution and request clarification regarding funding from the department.

A reply was received from the department on 24 January 2006, stating that the Minister could not agree to make funding available for the modified development.

Acting on the Ministers response the Council voted in favour of proceeding with the original plans on 13 February 2006.

Thomas Davis GAA club instituted judicial review proceedings in the High Court in May, 2006. Their main argument was that the decision of the council on 13 February 2006, to revert to the original plans for the stadium, which did not include a senior GAA pitch, was unlawful. Their submission on the technical point was accompanied by cultural arguments that 'the youth of Tallaght will be restricted to a diet of Association football' and that a soccer-only ground would place the 'applicant at a severe disadvantage in attracting the youth of Tallaght to the club, the sport and the GAA culture'. However the stadium, with the original design, could accommodate junior GAA games as the pitch used at this level fits within the stadium's dimensions. It was only senior GAA games that would not have been facilitated.

The disagreement had several low points that were played out in the media. Some Shamrock Rovers fans unveiled a banner at a league game showing their contempt for Thomas Davis's actions in taking the matter to court. And contrary to the GAA policy of being apolitical Thomas Davis GAA club made it known that the Minister of State Conor Lenihan TD, the local Dáil representative, was no longer welcome at the club because of his support for Minister John O'Donoghue's stance and called for the clubs members to make the stadium a General Election issue.

The judicial review began on 20 April 2007, and concluded on 14 December 2007. In the High Court decision Mr. Justice Roderick Murphy found in favour of South Dublin Co. Council and Shamrock Rovers. He found that Thomas Davis had no financial or proprietary interest in the development site having had no agreement with SDCC for its use and noted the extensive facilities they had already been given by the council. And so Thomas Davis was not prejudiced by the decision being made in February rather than late January. The resolution to change the stadium was conditional on additional funding from the department in the absence of this funding the resolution could not stand or, more properly, could not be implemented. The court concluded that "it would be wrong of the respondent to commit itself to unbudgeted expenditure or to delay the implementation of its resolution of 13 February 2005. The court, accordingly, refuses the relief sought by Thomas Davis."

An application by Thomas Davis for leave to appeal this decision to the Supreme court was refused by Judge Murphy on 25 January 2008. Building commenced on the stadium on 6 May 2008, six and a half years after work had first stopped.

Opening and development
The first match in the new stadium was held on 13 March 2009. Rovers made a winning start to life in Tallaght as they saw off the challenge of Sligo Rovers 2–1 in front of a sell-out crowd of 3,000. Gary Twigg had the honour of being the first man to score at the new stadium.

On 20 July 2009, Shamrock Rovers played Real Madrid at Tallaght Stadium as part of a "festival of football" which also included games against Newcastle United and Hibernian. Temporary seating was installed taking capacity up to 10,900. Real Madrid won the game by one goal to nil with a late goal. The match was notable for the debut appearance of Cristiano Ronaldo for Real Madrid. The second (east) stand was opened for a game against Dundalk on 22 August 2009, which attracted over 4,500 fans. The stadium was sold out the following week, albeit with capacity restrictions (meaning a crowd of about 5,400) for a derby with St Patrick's Athletic. Its first full house with the new capacity came against Bohemians on 2 October 2009, as 6,000 tickets were sold out a week in advance.

Tallaght Stadium won the 2010 Airtricity League Pitch of the Year award. It also won the 2012 Airtricity League Pitch of the Year award.

In 2019 the South Stand was opened, behind the southern goal, bringing the capacity up to nearly 8,000 seats. A north stand behind the opposite goal at the 'Square end', started construction in 2022. This will include 2,000 more seats, bringing the capacity of Tallaght stadium up to over 10,000 seats.

Cup Football
The 2009 FAI Cup Final was held at the stadium. Sporting Fingal were winners over Sligo Rovers before 8,105 people. The Setanta Sports Cup Final has been held on four occasions at Tallaght Stadium, in 2010, 2011, 2013, and 2014. In the 2013 final, on 13 May 2013, Shamrock Rovers defeated Drogheda United 7–1, in front of 4,022 fans.

League Football
The capacity of Tallaght Stadium was increased following the opening of the South Stand in 2019. Rovers achieved their biggest league attendance since moving to Tallaght in a 1–0 loss to Bohemians in front of a crowd of 6,414 on 23 April 2019. That league attendance figure was topped later that season with 7,021 attending a Rovers-Bohemians derby in which Shamrock Rovers were victorious 1–0 on 30 August 2019. The following season Rovers beat Dundalk 3–2 in front of a league record Tallaght crowd of 7,522 on 28 February 2020. Rovers clinched the 2021 League of Ireland Premier Division title in a 3–0 victory over Finn Harps on 29 October 2021 in front of 7,030 at Tallaght stadium. On 19 November 2021, a league record of 7,765 packed in to witness Shamrock Rovers crowned league champions for the 19th time.

European Football

The first European game in the stadium was held in July, 2010, when Rovers drew with Bnei Yehuda of Tel Aviv in the UEFA Europa League. After Rovers eliminated the Israelis the next round draw saw Juventus play at the stadium in front of a crowd of 5,800.

The stadium hosted its first UEFA Champions League game in July, 2011, and hosted Rovers' games in the 2011–12 UEFA Europa League group stage. In order to comply with UEFA criteria for participating in the group stages of the UEFA Europa League, a south stand was constructed over a short period in early September 2011. Although constructed with temporary style construction techniques & materials the new stand was passed fit by UEFA inspectors as fulfilling the criteria for permanent seating. The inclusion of the new south stand brought the stadium capacity above the minimum of 8,500 seats needed to be classified as a Category 4 Stadium as laid out in the UEFA Stadium Infrastructure Regulations. On 15 December 2011 Rovers lost 0–4 to Tottenham Hotspurs in its final group stage match of the 2011-12 Europa League in front of 8,500 fans. Due to seating restrictions at Richmond Park, St Patrick's Athletic played a 2011–12 UEFA Europa League third qualifying round home game against Karpaty Lviv at Tallaght Stadium,  and a 2012–13 UEFA Europa League qualifying phase match against Hannover 96. After the 2011–12 UEFA Europa League group stage, the seats were removed to bring the capacity of the stadium back to 6,000.

Rovers played FK Ekranas in the 2012–13 UEFA Champions League qualifying phase match at Tallaght stadium in front of 4,800 in July 2012.

The stadium hosted Dundalk's home match against BATE Borisov in the 2016–17 UEFA Champions League third qualifying round, and later their home Europa League group stage matches in 2016–17, after their home ground, Oriel Park, did not meet UEFA standards for hosting matches at either stage.

The stadium hosted group stages of the 2022–23 UEFA Europa Conference League as Rovers qualified for the second time for European group stage football.

International Women's Football
Tallaght Stadium has been hosting the Ireland's women's team's matches in its bid to qualify for the 2023 Women's World Cup. It hosted a record crowd for an Irish women's football match, with 6,952 in attendance for Ireland's 1–0 victory over Finland to secure a play-off spot for the 2023 World Cup.

Current layout

Main stand
The main stand runs the length of the west side of the pitch and was the first stand to open in the stadium. It houses the club's officials and the press facilities as well as about 3,000 seats. The main stand also houses the dressing rooms. The club's superstore is situated behind the stand.

East stand
The east stand runs the length of the east side of the pitch and was opened late in the 2009 season with capacity for about 3,000 seats. The ultras within the club's support base used to congregate in the east stand, but in 2019, with the opening of the South Stand, the more vociferous Rovers supporters relocated there. Away supporters are now accommodated in the east stand. In July 2010 a control room was constructed at the car park end of the east stand.

South Stand

The south stand, located behind one of the goals, was opened in 2019, holding just under 2,000 seats. Since then it has housed many of Rovers more vocal supporters.

North Stand

The North stand located behind the Tallaght 'Square end' goal began construction in mid 2022 and will bring the stadium up to a UEFA Category 4 stadium. This development cost €11.5m and includes Improvement works  in the main stand's corporate area to provide enhanced media, conference and meeting room facilities. The new North Stand will hold over 2,000 spectators, increasing capacity from 8,000 to 10,000. The expansion project is expected to be completed by the end of July 2023.

Other sports

Rugby league
Ireland played their last match of the 2010 European Cup at Tallaght Stadium, losing 42–22 to Scotland. As part of the 2014 Rugby League European Championship, Tallaght Stadium hosted the match between Ireland and France on 18 October. Tallaght stadium also hosted the match between Ireland and Scotland on 25 October 2014.

Rugby union
The stadium hosted its first rugby international game when a crowd of 4,016 saw the Ireland A national rugby union team defeat their Argentinian counterparts in November, 2009. The first club rugby game was held in August 2012, as 2011–12 Heineken Cup winners Leinster Rugby beat Gloucester Rugby in a preseason friendly.

American football
The 2010 Shamrock Bowl, the final of the Irish American Football League, was held on 7 August 2010. Dublin Rebels defeated the University of Limerick Vikings 15–0. The final was expected to be played in Tallaght again in 2011, should a Dublin-based team reach the final however Morton Stadium was selected over Tallaght Stadium to host the 2011 Final. The 2012 Shamrock Bowl was played in Tallaght on 14 July 2012, with Belfast Trojans triumphant.

In June, 2013, the EFAF Atlantic Cup was held at Tallaght Stadium.

Other uses 

During the COVID-19 pandemic, Tallaght Stadium was used as a drive-through test centre.

References

External links

 Tallaght Stadium at club website

Sports venues in South Dublin (county)
Sports venues completed in 2009
Association football venues in the Republic of Ireland
Shamrock Rovers F.C.
Tallaght
Association football venues in County Dublin
2009 establishments in Ireland
21st-century architecture in the Republic of Ireland